Bloodwood is a common name for several unrelated trees, including:

 Baloghia inophylla (Brush or Scrub bloodwood), Baloghia marmorata (Marbled bloodwood), Baloghia parviflora (Small-flowered bloodwood), all found in Australia
 Brosimum rubescens, a tree found in Central and South America
 Many Myrtaceae trees in the genus Corymbia from Australia, formerly from the genus Eucalyptus; Corymbia gummifera (Red bloodwood), Corymbia intermedia (Pink bloodwood), Corymbia ptychocarpa (Swamp and Spring bloodwood), Corymbia opaca (Desert bloodwood), Corymbia eximia (Yellow bloodwood) etc.
 Casuarina equisetifolia, found in Southeast Asia, Northern Australia and the Pacific
 Cyrilla racemiflora found in the Neotropics
 Gordonia haematoxylon, a tree from Jamaica
 Haematoxylum campechianum, a tree from Central America and Caribbean
  Lagerstroemia speciosa (Indian bloodwood)
 Several trees from the genus Pterocarpus from Africa and Asia, the trees yields a red exsudate which soon harden into crimson tears (Kino, Dragon's blood); Pterocarpus angolensis, Pterocarpus erinaceus, Pterocarpus rotundifolius, Pterocarpus indicus, Pterocarpus officinalis (Dragon's blood), etc. The Pterocarpus wood is traded under different names but normally not as bloodwood.
 Vachellia haematoxylon (Syn.: Acacia haematoxylon) Bloodwood-Acacia, southern Africa

See also 
 Ironwood
 Rosewood

References
  

Wood